Harold Heneage Finch-Hatton (23 August 1856 – 16 May 1904) was a British politician and Australian federationist.

Early life
Finch-Hatton was born in Eastwell Park, Kent, England, the fourth son of George Finch-Hatton, 10th Earl of Winchilsea and his wife Fanny Margaretta, daughter of Edward Royd Rice of Dane Court, Kent. He was educated at Eton College and Balliol College, Oxford, and at 19 years of age went to Queensland to visit his brother Henry Finch-Hatton. He took up land in the Mackay district and later worked on the Nebo goldfields. Returning to England in 1883 he published in 1885 an account of his travels Advance Australia! (2nd ed. 1886).

“Advance Australia!” publication
According to The Times in 1904 this book was written in an entertaining way, but his statements about the Aborigines and his views on Australian politicians must be accepted with caution. Finch-Hatton's written recollections of his eight years around the Mackay area of Queensland is an account of British colonial life in the Antipodes.

Voyage from Singapore to Keppel Bay
Finch-Hatton travelled aboard the Somerset which along the way, somewhere in the Indonesian archipelago, “ran down a native boat and drowned everyone in it.”  They anchored off the pearling station of Somerset on Cape York where “black divers..go down and bring up the mother-of-pearl shells,” and a couple of white men have taken residence purely “to enjoy the society of black women.” Finch-Hatton writes that the Government Resident was waging an endless war against the local aboriginal clans. He eventually arrived in Keppel Bay off Rockhampton and then made his way to his brother's station near Mackay.

Mackay and surrounds
A description of the frontier town of Mackay is given, including the various sheep, cattle and sugar industries that were beginning to be established around it.  The implementation of the Marsupial Act is depicted where droves of marsupials were entrapped and destroyed to reduce competition for the fodder of the introduced stock.  The author writes about the boiling down establishments where thousands of excess sheep and cattle were boiled down to make tallow, which ensured a basement price for all stock at £1 10s a head. Life on the nearby goldfields of Mt Britten and Canoona is described and the difficult life of a bullock driver is mentioned.

Aboriginals
In a section about the types of hunting available for the sportsman in Australia, Finch Hatton writes that “away up north an occasional raid after the wild Blacks enlivens the monotony of life.” He says that just about every station has a couple of “black boys” working stockmen but “they are not much use after they get about 20 years old..they generally get sent away..and sooner or later die of drink.” Many aboriginals worked on the tobacco plantations and a school had been set up in Mackay to educate some of them. The deliberate mass poisoning of aboriginals at Long Lagoon is recounted as is the practice “when the blacks are troublesome, it is generally considered sufficient punishment to go out and shoot one or two.” He further explains that “whether the blacks deserve any mercy at the hands of the pioneering squatters is an open question, but that they get none is certain. They are a doomed race and..they will be completely wiped out of the land.”

Native Police
Finch-Hatton also writes about the Native Police, which was a force of black troopers under the command of a white officer, whose job was to “disperse” groups of aboriginals who speared livestock and, occasionally, shepherds. He narrates that the Native Police officer “knows perfectly well that unless he manages to shoot down a decent number of (blacks) before they can escape his services will soon be dispensed with.”

Kanakas and Coolies
The issues surrounding labour on the plantations is described at length. The conditions of Kanaka indentured workers kidnapped or recruited from places like the New Hebrides are mentioned. They were paid a lowly wage of £6 a year on a three-year contract, after which they were induced to spend most of this money at stores in town selling “the most utterly worthless” goods at an astronomical mark-up. Finch-Hatton tells of a riot at the Mackay races between whites and Kanakas, where in response to the Kanakas throwing bottles, the white men climbed upon their horses and charged them wielding their stirrup-irons, killing a few and driving the rest into the canefields. The political struggle between the plantation owners and those calling for compulsory employment of white labour at good wages is explained. To maintain cheap workers, the planters tried importing “coolie” labour of ethnicities including Singhalese, Malays, Indians and Maltese.

Imperial Federation
Finch-Hatton was an enthusiastic advocate for Imperial Federation, where all the Englishmen in the British colonies would unite in a close racial, religious and political unity in order to realise an overwhelming global domination. He ends the book deploring the now mostly realised possibility of the Empire disintegrating and England sinking into obscurity.

Politics
Finch-Hatton was an unsuccessful candidate for the British House of Commons in 1885, 1886 and 1892, but was returned as a Conservative for Newark in 1895. He resigned in 1898 on account of disagreement with the policy of his party of making concessions made to the Liberal Unionists. He was one of the founders of the Imperial Federation League, and when the North Queensland Separation League was formed he was appointed chairman of the London committee. He also worked for the development of the Pacific route to Australia, and was secretary to the Pacific Telegraph Company for the formation of a line from Vancouver Island to Australia.

Later life
He died suddenly of heart failure at London on 16 May 1904. 
He was buried in Ewerby, Lincolnshire.

He was unmarried.

Legacy

The town of Finch Hatton, Queensland in Australia is believed to be named after him.

Publications
  — available online

References

External links 

1856 births
1904 deaths
Conservative Party (UK) MPs for English constituencies
Australian federationists
Australian people of English descent
People educated at Eton College
Alumni of Balliol College, Oxford
UK MPs 1895–1900
Younger sons of earls
Harold
Finch Hatton, Queensland